Lucy Chappell  is a British professor of obstetrics at King’s College London and the Chief Scientific Adviser (CSA) for the UK Department of Health and Social Care. As part of her CSA role, she oversees the National Institute for Health and Care Research (NIHR) as Chief Executive Officer. Her research areas include medical problems during pregnancy such as pre-eclampsia, and the safety of medicines in pregnancy.

Early life and education 
Chappell received her education at Guy's and St Thomas’ Medical School in London and later at the University of Cambridge. Her PhD focused on prevention of pre-eclampsia and included work on the placental growth factor.  She also completed a subspeciality training in maternal–fetal medicine and acquired a Master's degree in education from King's College London.

Research and career 
Chappell holds the positions of Senior Investigator for the NIHR, Honorary Consultant Obstetrician at Guy's and St. Thomas' NHS Foundation Trust, and Professor of Obstetrics at King's College London. She directs a research program that uses observational studies and randomised controlled trials to investigate the prediction and prevention of unfavorable pregnancy outcomes, particularly in women with pre-existing co-morbidities such chronic hypertension and chronic renal disease.

She has been a member of the Royal College of Obstetricians and Gynaecologists (RCOG) since 2002 and a fellow since 2017. She was the President of the Blair Bell Research Society, affiliated to the RCOG, from 2018 to 2021. Her editorial work includes being a board member at the Journal of the Royal Society of Medicine and formerly at PLoS Medicine.

Chappell participated as national pregnancy lead investigator for the RECOVERY Trial, a major trial that looked into possible COVID-19 infection therapies. Since August 2021 she works as Chief Scientific Adviser (CSA) at the Department of Health and Social Care and CEO of the NIHR.

Awards and honours 

 NIHR Senior Investigator
 NIHR Research Professorship
 Gold Medal, Blair Bell Research Society

Selected publications

External links

Bibliographic databases 

 
 
 Lucy Chappell at PubMed

References 

Living people
English obstetricians
English gynaecologists
Fellows of the Academy of Medical Sciences (United Kingdom)
Alumni of the University of Cambridge
Alumni of King's College London
21st-century women physicians
Fellows of the Royal College of Obstetricians and Gynaecologists
NIHR Senior Investigators
Year of birth missing (living people)